Stephen Mitford Goodson (1948 - 4 August 2018) was a South African banker, author and politician who was the leader of South Africa's Abolition of Income Tax and Usury Party. He stood as a candidate for the Ubuntu Party in the 2014 General Elections. Goodson has authored a total of 7 books on banking and history.

Banking
He was a director of the South African Reserve Bank (2003–12) and previously a financial consultant in Pringle Bay.

Despite his career, Goodson has also been an active commentator with regards to the problems of the central banking system, writing the book "A History of Central Banking and the Enslavement of Mankind", published by Black House Publishing Limited. In such book Goodson, with reference to historical sources and events, argues against what he deems to be the "scam" of the central banking system.

Holocaust denial
Goodson had stated that the Holocaust was "a huge lie" as "the principle is to extract enormous sums of money from the Germans as compensation", blaming international bankers. Goodson authored a book titled Bonaparte & Hitler Versus the International Bankers where he maintained World War II was provoked by the economic success of Germany, and he has also criticized the political actions of Jewish bankers, posting his views on like-minded websites. As a result, the South African Israel Public Affairs Committee called for the Reserve Bank to fire him for his statements, considered to be pro-Nazi.

He has been a contributing editor since 2010 of the Barnes Review, a magazine promoting Historical revisionism.

In a 2010 radio interview, Goodson stated:

The National Chairman of the South African Jewish Board of Deputies, Mary Kluk, subsequently condemned Goodson's opinions:

The views purportedly disseminated by Stephen Goodson are hurtful and offensive, not only in the way they give credence to the pernicious theory that Jews fabricated the Holocaust in order to extort money from Germany  but in how they serve to glorify the legacy of the hateful Nazi regime. Such views serve only to distort the historical record, falsely denying a time when ideologies of racial hatred caused untold suffering to millions and insulting the memory of the innocent victims of those times.

In April 2012, the South African Reserve Bank stated that Goodson's tenure for his position would not be renewed after it expired in July, as he would have served the maximum period of three terms of three years each. On May 3, 2012, Goodson resigned from SA Reserve Bank after he had received compensation for the balance of his term of office.

In June 2017, Goodson was one of the primary motivators of the Public Protector's Report of 19 June 2017 regarding the proposal to reform the South African Reserve Bank to abolish inflation targeting, shocking rating agencies, economists, and politicians alike.

In response to an article written about Goodson in the South African Jewish Report, which was published on 30 June 2017, Goodson explained that his Holocaust denial is predicated on the claim that in World War II memoirs written by Winston Churchill, Charles de Gaulle, Dwight D. Eisenhower and Harry S. Truman, there is no mention of millions of Jews in Europe having been annihilated. This claim is false.

World War II revisionism 
On the Veterans Today website, Holocaust denier Ingrid Rimland Zundel quoted from Goodson when she wrote that Japan "had peacefully occupied Indochina, with the permission of Vichy France", but eventually was "forced into attacking America in order to maintain her prosperity and secure her existence as a sovereign state." Rimland Zundel also reposted a piece by Goodson who admired how Hitler had defeated the "banksters".

Death
Goodson died on 4 August 2018.

Books
 An Illustrated Guide to Adolf Hitler and the Third Reich (2009, The Barnes Review)
 General Jan Christian Smuts: The Debunking of a Myth  (2012, Bienedell Publishers)
 A History of Central Banking and the Enslavement of Mankind  (2014, Black House Publishing)
 Inside the South African Reserve Bank Its Origins and Secrets Exposed  (2014, Black House Publishing)
 Rhodesian Prime Minister Ian Smith: The Debunking of a Myth  (2015, Self-published)
 Hendrik Frensch Verwoerd South Africa's Greatest Prime Minister  (2016, Self-published)
 The Genocide of the Boers  (2017, The Barnes Review)

Notes

1948 births
2018 deaths
Holocaust deniers
Ubuntu Party politicians
South African bankers
South African people of English descent
Antisemitism in South Africa